Vancouver, British Columbia has a large film and television production industry, which earned it the nickname "Hollywood North." It usually serves as a substitute location for other cities and locales. This is a list, arranged by region, of films and television series shot in the Lower Mainland, including several prominent filming locations in Greater Vancouver and the Fraser Valley, plus those in the adjoining Sea-to-Sky Corridor and Sunshine Coast regions.

Village of Anmore

Buntzen Lake
The 4400 (TV series)
Dark Angel (TV series)
Freddy vs. Jason
Hot Rod
It
Lake Placid (1999)
Pathfinder
Smallville (TV series)
Supernatural (TV series)
The X-Files (TV series)

Bowen Island Municipality
American Gothic
Charlie St. Cloud
Double Jeopardy
The Fog
Harper's Island
The Russia House
The Wicker Man

Britannia Beach
Are We There Yet?
Final Days of Planet Earth
Free Willy 3: The Rescue
Hope Island
Scooby-Doo 2
Stargate SG-1 – "Thor's Hammer" episode
The Magicians
The Man in the High Castle (TV series)
The X-Files

Brunswick Beach
Fear

City of Burnaby

The Bridge Studios
See The Bridge Studios article for full listing.
Black Christmas (2006)
John Tucker Must Die (2006)
Juno (2007)
Passengers (2007)
Stargate Atlantis
Stargate SG-1
Stargate Universe

BB Studios (Beresford Street Studios)
Arrow (TV series)
 The Flash (TV series)
Smallville (TV series)

7530 Buller Avenue, Burnaby, BC
Smallville (TV series)
Arrow (TV series)
Batwoman (TV series)

First Avenue Studio
Married Life

BCIT
Supernatural

Burnaby City Hall
Snakes on a Plane

Burnaby Hospital
Stargate SG-1
Supernatural
White Noise

Burnaby Mountain
My Life Without Me
Stargate SG-1 (TV series)
Wonder Park

Burnaby Mountain Secondary School
The Invisible
Riverdale (TV series)

Burnaby Village Museum
Huckleberry Finn and His Friends (TV series)
Supernatural

Central Park
Juno
New Moon
Smallville (TV series)
Stargate SG-1 (TV series)

Deer Lake Park
The Day the Earth Stood Still
Final Destination 3
Life Unexpected
Once Upon a Time (TV series)
She's The Man
Stakeout (Oakalla Prison)

Kent Hangar
Elysium
Mission: Impossible – Ghost Protocol
Tomorrowland

National Nikkei Heritage Centre

Psych (TV series)

Simon Fraser University (SFU)
The 6th Day
Agent Cody Banks
Andromeda (TV series)
Antitrust
Battlestar Galactica
The Day the Earth Stood Still
Fallen
The Fly II
iZombie (TV series)- Blusson Hall
Hellcats (TV series)
jPod (TV series)
Kyle XY
Personal Effects
She's The Man
Spy Game
Stargate SG-1 (TV series)
Underworld: Awakening
Viper (TV series)
The X-Files (TV series)
The Flash (2014 TV series)

Lougheed Town Centre
2Gether
Breaking News
Dead Like Me
Duets
Freddy Got Fingered
I Was A Teenage Faust
Just Deal
Nightman
Off Season
Perfect Little Angels
While She Was Out

Metrotown
Life-Size
The NeverEnding Story III

City of Chilliwack and area

City Centre (Downtown)
Eureka
Monster Truck
White Chicks

Cultus Lake
Manhood
Rampage
Snakehead Terror
Taylor's Way

City of Coquitlam

Chimo Aquatic and Fitness Centre
Aliens vs. Predator: Requiem

Centennial Secondary School
Aliens vs. Predator: Requiem
American Pie Presents: Book of Love
Psych

Coquitlam City Hall
Da Vinci's Inquest (TV series) – court scenes are in the council chambers

Coquitlam Centre
Christmas Bounty
Grumpy Cat's Worst Christmas Ever
Juno
The Sisterhood of the Traveling Pants

Dawes Hill
Hot Rod

Mundy Park
Deck the Halls

Red Robinson Show Theatre
Psych (TV series)

Riverview Hospital
The Last Mimzy
Second Chance (TV series)
Crease Clinic:
The 4400 (TV series)
Battlestar Galactica (TV series)
Birdland (TV series)
Case 39
Dark Angel
Frankie & Alice
Fringe (TV series)
Halloween: Resurrection
Happy Gilmore
Human Target (TV series)
Jennifer's Body
Life Unexpected
Reefer Madness: The Musical
Romeo Must Die
Shutter Island
Smallville (TV series)
Stargate: Atlantis
Supernatural (TV series)
X-Files (TV series)
West Lawn:
Falling Skies
Grave Encounters
Grave Encounters 2
Jennifer 8

Quarry
Stargate SG-1 (TV series)

United Boulevard (Fraser Riverbank)
Arrow (TV series)

Various Locations
The Day The Earth Stood Still

Corporation of Delta

Alaksen National Wildlife Area
Huckleberry Finn and His Friends (TV series)

Ladner
The 6th Day
Eureka
Juno
Josie and the Pussycats
She's the Man
Shooter
Three Moons Over Milford
Trick 'r Treat

Tsawwassen
Hellcats
Jumanji
Smallville (TV series)
Supernatural (TV series)
Totally Awesome
X-Men: The Last Stand

Annacis Island
Fantastic Four
I, Robot
Paycheck

District of Hope
Far from Home: The Adventures of Yellow Dog
First Blood
Shoot to Kill
Suspicious River
Sweet Virginia
A Dog's Way Home

"Stick Up"

Langley City
The Butterfly Effect
Flash Gordon (TV series)
Rampage
Whistler (TV series)

Township of Langley

Aldergrove
Bates Motel
Bob the Butler
Dragon Boys (filmed near Dawson Brill Lumber site)
Smallville
Twilight Saga (filmed in Township of Langley)

Fort Langley
Air Bud: Spikes Back
Alice, I Think (TV series) (filmed in South Langley near Campbell Valley)
Are We There Yet?
The Fog
Gunless
Home for Christmas
Hope Springs
Once Upon a Time (TV series)
Riverworld
Supernatural (TV series)
Taken (TV series)
The Vampire Diaries (TV series)
Riverdale (TV series)
Slither
Jingle All The Way 2

Village of Lions Bay and area
Battlestar Galactica
Caprica
Elektra
Whale Music
Ozarks

City of Maple Ridge
Battle of the Bulbs
BloodRayne II: Deliverance
Bordertown (TV series)
Merlin's Apprentice
Percy Jackson and the Lightning Thief
Rumble in the Bronx
Stargate SG-1 (TV series)

Thornhill/Whonnock
Jumanji

Ruskin
Supernatural (TV series)

District of Mission
Percy Jackson & the Olympians: The Lightning Thief
Horns
Twilight: New Moon

Stave Falls Dam
We're No Angels

Stave Falls Powerhouse (interior)
Stargate: Atlantis
Stargate: SG1

Ruskin Dam
Dark Angel (TV series)
The Invisible
Smallville (TV series)
The X-Files (TV series)

St. Mary's Indian Residential School
Battlestar Galactica (TV series)

City of New Westminster

Unknown / various
The Exorcism of Emily Rose
Final Destination 3
Harry Tracy, Desperado
Quantico (pilot; Criminal Minds, working title)
Rumble in the Bronx (filmed on Front ST)
Hostage Negotiator
Once Upon a Time

6th Street / Royal City Centre Mall
Carpool

3rd Street
Bird on a Wire

Front Street / Downtown
Blade
Cats & Dogs: The Revenge of Kitty Galore
I Love You, Beth Cooper
I, Robot
The Killing
New Moon
Shooter
Short Time
This Means War

Holy Trinity Cathedral 
Deck the Halls

The Metro Hall
Supernatural

New Westminster Secondary School
21 Jump Street (TV series)

Paramount Theatre
It
New Moon

Queen's Park
Married Life
Miracle

Old Terminal Pub
Dead Like Me (TV series)
Supernatural (TV series)
Watchmen

Samson V
Huckleberry Finn and His Friends (TV series)

Westminster Quay
My Life Without Me

Woodlands 
Dark Angel (TV series)
It 
The X-Files (TV series)

City of North Vancouver

Boulevard Park
The 4400 (TV series)
Good Luck Chuck

Lonsdale Quay
Agent Cody Banks
Dead Like Me
Tru Calling

North Shore Park / North Shore Auto Mall
Psych (TV series)

Pier 97
Fantastic Four

Neptune Terminals
Stargate SG-1

Burrard Dry Dock Pier
Fringe (TV series)

District of North Vancouver (North Shore)

Back woods 
The 100 (TV show)

Cleveland Dam
The 6th Day
Along Came a Spider
The Commish (TV series)
Dark Angel (2000 TV series)
Eraser
First Blood
The Invisible
The Man in the High Castle (TV series)
Smallville (TV series)
Supernatural (TV series)
"The Vampire Diaries" (TV series)
The 100

Cates Park
Killer Instinct

Edgemont Village
Double Jeopardy

Grouse Mountain
American Pie Presents: Book of Love
The X-Files (TV series)
"Supernatural" (TV series)

Lions Gate Studios
The 6th Day
Elektra
The Fog
Josie and the Pussycats
Psych (TV series)
Reindeer Games
Scary Movie 4
Scooby-Doo 2: Monsters Unleashed
Smallville (TV series)
Willard

Lynn Canyon Park
Once Upon a Time (TV series)
Jumanji
Lost in Space (2018 TV series)
X-Men: The Last Stand
Zoo (TV series)

Mount Seymour Provincial Park
Atomic Train
Little Women
M.A.N.T.I.S.
MacGyver (TV series)
Highlander
Pathfinder
Stargate SG-1
The X-Files (TV series)

Mount Seymour
Hot Tub Time Machine
Snow Buddies

Sutherland Secondary School
Life Unexpected

Seycove Secondary School
Bates Motel (TV series)
Charlie St. Cloud
Supernatural

Windsor Secondary School
The X-Files (TV series)

Pemberton
See Pemberton for details.
The 13th Warrior
Fantastic Four: Rise of the Silver Surfer
The Grey Fox
The Journey of Natty Gann
Mile Zero
Ski Hard aka Downhill Willie aka Ski Nuts
The Twilight Saga: Breaking Dawn – Part 1 and The Twilight Saga: Breaking Dawn – Part 2
Tyler Perry's Why Did I Get Married?
The X-Files: I Want to Believe

Commercials:
2013 - Subaru film shoot
2012 - Procter & Gamble Olympic commercial
2011 - Kia car commercial
2004 - Mountain Dew commercial filmed at Pemberton Airport
2003 - Smart Set Clothing Co. fashion photo shoot at One Mile Lake
2003 - Hyundai car commercial filmed at Pemberton Airport
2002 - Chevy truck commercial filmed at One Mile Lake

City of Pitt Meadows
3000 Miles To Graceland
Blonde and Blonder
Duets
First Blood
The Grey Fox

Swan-e-set Golf Course and Resort:
Brotherhood IV
Happy Gilmore

Port Moody

Heritage Woods Secondary School
Eureka
John Tucker Must Die

City of Richmond

Fantasy Gardens
Cousins
Halloweentown II: Kalabar's Revenge
Highlander: The Series
Killer Instinct
Postal
Stargate: Atlantis
Stargate SG-1
Supernatural

Gateway Theatre
Psych (TV series)
Smallville (TV series)

H.J. Cambie Secondary School
Aliens in America
Fringe (TV series)
Life Unexpected

McMath Secondary School
The 6th Day
Supernatural

Minoru Park
Smallville

Sand Dunes
10.5
Battlestar Galactica
RV
Stargate SG-1

Richmond Centre
Dead Like Me

RCMP Richmond Main Detachment Building
The Drive of Life (Hong Kong TV drama)

Steveston
The 4400 (TV series)
Cats & Dogs 2
Charlie St. Cloud
Dreamcatcher
Godzilla (2014)
Highlander: The Series
Killer Instinct
Kingdom Hospital
Knight Rider 2012
Lost Boys 2
Once Upon a Time
Scary Movie
The Secret Circle
Stargate SG-1
Supernatural
Taken
Three Moons Over Milford
The Traveler
The Twilight Saga: Eclipse
The Uninvited
The X-Files

YVR
Aliens in America
Are We There Yet?
Border Security: Canada's Front Line (Canadian TV series)
The Cleaner
Fantastic Four: Rise of the Silver Surfer
Final Destination
Firewall
Flight 93 (TV film)
Good Luck Chuck
The Killing
The L Word
The Lizzie McGuire Movie
Passengers
The Sisterhood of the Traveling Pants
Snow Dogs
Supernatural

Lansdowne Centre
Josie and the Pussycats

Squamish
TV series:
Andromeda (2000–2005)
Arctic Air (2014)
Bates Motel (2015)
Blade (2006)
Continuum (2012)
The Flash (2016)
Great Canadian Books (2010)
Green Arrow
The Guard (2008)
The Highlander
MacGyver (1985)
Men in Trees (2006)
Midnight Sun (2014)
Motive (2014)
Restless Josie (2011)
The Returned (2015)
Rick Mercer Report
Search and Rescue (2008)
The Sentinel
Supernatural (2016)
Timeless (2016)
The X-Files (1993)
The Good Doctor (2017)

Commercials:
Canadian Tire
Delta Airlines
Ford
Kellogg's
Land Rover
Ralph Lauren
Snickers
Tim Hortons
Scotiabank

Feature films:
The 12 Disasters of Christmas (2012 TV movie)
3000 Miles to Graceland (2001)
A Fool and His Honey (2017)
Backcountry (2014)
Behemoth (2011 TV movie)
Best. Trip. Ever. (2010 TV movie)
Beyond Gravity (2000)
Big Nothing (2006)
The Big Year (2011)
Bloodsuckers (2005 TV movie)
Chaos Theory (2008)
Coming Home for Christmas (2013 video)
A Dangerous Man (2009 video)
Dark Island (2010)
Darkly Machiever (1997 short film)
Deadly Pursuit (1988)
Double Jeopardy (1999)
Earth's Final Hours (2011 TV movie)
Embrace of the Vampire (2013 video)
End of the World (2013 TV movie)
Far Cry (2008)
Final Ascent (2000 TV movie)
Final Destination (2000)
Firestorm (1998)
The Fourth Kind (2009)
Free Willy 3: The Rescue (1997)
Goodbye (2012 short film)
Happy Face Killer (2014 TV movie)
The Haze (2012 short film)
Hike (2010 short film)
Horns (2013)
Ice Road Terror (2011 TV movie)
In the Shadow of the Chief (2003 documentary)
Insomnia (2002)
The Interview (2015)
Into the Forest
Kevin of the North (2001)
Kraken: Tentacles of the Deep (2006 TV movie)
Life Is Calling My Name (2008 documentary)
Little Black Caddy (2005 short film)
Lone Hero (2002)
Lunch with Charles (2001)
Marijuana PSA (2015 short film)
The Marine 4: Moving Target (2015 video)
McCabe & Mrs. Miller (1971)
MVP: Most Valuable Primate (2000)
No Clue (2013)
Pathfinder (2007)
Peacemakers (1997)
The Revenant (2015)
Revisiting "Suddenly" (2013 documentary)
The Rise of Enduro (2014 documentary)
Say It Isn't So (2001)
Star Trek Beyond (2015)
Suddenly (2013)
Thrown (2002 short film)
The Tree That Saved Christmas (2014 TV movie)
The Twilight Saga: Breaking Dawn - Part 1 (2011)
Walking Tall (2004)
Way of the Wicked (2014)
What It Takes: A Documentary About 4 World Class Triathletes' Quest for Greatness (2006 documentary)
White Fang 2: Myth of the White Wolf (1994)
Wild Guys (2004)
The Woods (2013)
Zolar (2004 TV movie)

City of Surrey

Cloverdale
The 4400 (TV series)
Bionic Woman (TV series)
Deck The Halls
Fire With Fire
Hot Rod
Postal
Smallville (TV series)

Central City Shopping Centre
Catwoman
Fantastic Four
I, Robot
Painkiller Jane
Smallville (TV series)

Guildford Town Centre
The Evidence (TV series)

Clayton Heights Secondary School
Saved!

North Surrey Secondary School
Agent Cody Banks
Jennifer's Body

SFU Surrey Campus
Chaos

Softball City
Juno

South Surrey
Deck the Halls
Human Target (TV series)
The Twilight Saga: Breaking Dawn

Sullivan Heights Secondary School
Another Cinderella Story

City of Vancouver

Unknown / various
The Andromeda Strain (2008 film)
Bird on a Wire (1990 film)
The Death of the Incredible Hulk (1990 TV film)
Mystery Date
The Trial of the Incredible Hulk (1989 TV film)

2404 Guelph Street
Dirk Gently's Holistic Detective Agency (TV series) (Season 1)

2400 Motel on Kingsway
3000 Miles to Graceland
Beyond Belief: Fact or Fiction
Smallville (TV series)
Supernatural (TV series)
The X-Files (TV series)

BC Place Stadium
The 6th Day
Butterfly on a Wheel
Caprica (TV series)
Fantastic Four
Highlander: The Series
MacGyver (TV series)
Paycheck
Sea Beast (aka Troglodyte)
Smallville (TV series)
 The Flash (TV series)
The Troop (TV series)
Two For The Money

Burrard Station
The Dead Zone (TV series)
Edison Force
Paycheck
The Trial of the Incredible Hulk
V (TV series)

Burrard Street Bridge
Highlander: The Series
Fantastic Four
Free Willy 3: The Rescue

Canada Post: Downtown office
Ecks vs. Sever
Smallville (TV series)

Chinatown, Vancouver
10.5
Caprica
Highlander: The Series
Cousins
Falling Skies
Fringe (TV series)
Killer Instinct
The Killing (TV series)
Rumble in the Bronx
Supernatural (TV series)
They Wait
Unforgettable
The X-Files (TV series)
X-Men: The Last Stand
Always Be My Maybe (2019 film)

Georgia Viaduct, Vancouver
Deadpool

David Thompson Secondary School
21 Jump Street
Eclipse
New Moon
Psych (TV series)

Eric Hamber Secondary School
21 Jump Street (TV series)
Juno
Riverdale (TV series)

Gladstone Secondary School
21 Jump Street
Supernatural (TV series)

Gastown
21 Jump Street (TV series)
Big Eyes
Booker (TV series)
Caprica (TV series)
Catwoman
Elegy
The Final Cut
Fringe (TV series)
Good Luck Chuck
Hellcats
Highlander: The Series
I, Robot
The Imaginarium of Doctor Parnassus
The Killing (TV series)
Kingdom Hospital
Legends of the Fall
Man of the House (1995 film)
Messages Deleted
Murphy's Law (TV series)
The NeverEnding Story
Romeo Must Die
Sliders
Stingray (TV series)
Supernatural (TV series)
They Wait
Top of the Hill (TV series)
Unsub (TV series)
Wiseguy (TV series)

Government of Canada Building
Good Luck Chuck
Smallville

Granville Island
Good Luck Chuck
Mission: Impossible – Ghost Protocol
Saving Silverman
The Suite Life Movie
Midnight Sun

Henry Hudson Elementary School
Daddy Day Care
Dark Water

John Oliver Secondary
21 Jump Street
What Goes Up
Riverdale (2017 TV series)
There's Someone Inside Your House

Kerrisdale
Air Bud
Diary of a Wimpy Kid: Rodrick Rules
Josie and the Pussycats
Little Man
Jinxed (house collapse scene)
Once Upon a Time

Kitsilano
Life-Size
Personal Effects
Things We Lost in the Fire

Kitsilano Secondary School:
21 Jump Street
Good Luck Chuck
John Tucker Must Die
Riverdale (2017 TV series)
Santa Clause 2
That Cold Day in the Park
Tron: Legacy
Two for the Money

Lions Gate Bridge
The 6th Day
Are We There Yet?
Final Destination 5
Tron: Legacy

Lord Byng Secondary School
21 Jump Street
The Boy Who Could Fly
Hollow Man 2
The Layover
Masters of Horror
Pretty Little Liars (TV series)
Riverdale (2017 TV series)
Swindle
The X-Files
X-Men Origins: Wolverine

Lord Strathcona Elementary School
The Perfect Score
Chilling Adventures of Sabrina

Magee Secondary School
I Love You, Beth Cooper
John Tucker Must Die

Mary’s on Davie West End, Vancouver
Main Event (Netflix Movie)
Career Opportunities in Murder and Mayhem (TV Series)

Marine Building

Battle in Seattle
Blade: Trinity
Fantastic Four
Life or Something Like It
Smallville
Timecop

Mountain View Cemetery
Fringe (TV series)
Highlander: The Series
The Killing (TV series)
Martian Child

Molson Canadian Brewery
Battlestar Galactica (TV series)

Nat Bailey Stadium
Highlander: The Series
Malicious
Martian Child

Oakridge Centre
21 Jump Street
Dead Like Me

One Wall Centre
The Core
X-Men: The Last Stand

The Orpheum Theatre
Battlestar Galactica (TV series)
Caprica (TV series)
Fringe (TV series)
Hellcats
Highlander: The Series (TV series)
The Imaginarium of Doctor Parnassus
The L Word (TV series)
Psych (TV series)
Sliders (TV series)
The Twilight Saga: Breaking Dawn - Part 1
The X-Files (TV series)

Pacific National Exhibition 
3000 Miles To Graceland
Are We There Yet?
Best in Show
Cats & Dogs
Fear
Final Destination 3
Happy Gilmore
Kyle XY
The L Word
A Man, a Woman and a Bank
Miracle
Percy Jackson: Sea of Monsters
Riding the Bullet
Rocky IV

Plaza of Nations
Fantastic 4
Final Destination 2
Highlander: The Series
The Outer Limits
Stargate SG-1
X-Men 2
Zenon: Girl of the 21st Century

Point Grey Secondary School
21 Jump Street
Life as We Know It (TV series)
Riverdale (2017 TV series)
She's the Man
Principal Takes a Holiday
To All the Boys I've Loved Before
To All the Boys: P.S. I Still Love You

Queen Elizabeth Park
Andromeda
The Boy Who Could Fly
Stargate SG-1

Ridge Theatre interior and Ridge Bowling Alley interior (now demolished)
Out of the Blue
New Moon
Supernatural

Robson Square
The 4400 (TV series)
Chaos Theory
Fringe (TV series)
Highlander: The Series
Runaway (1984 film)
Shoot to Kill
Smallville (TV series)
Stargate SG-1 (TV series)
The X-Files (TV series)
X-Men: The Last Stand

Rogers Arena (formerly General Motors Place)
The 6th Day
The 6th Man
Air Bud
Josie and The Pussycats
The L Word
MVP 2: Most Vertical Primate
The X-Files

Royal Bank of Canada Downtown
Supernatural

Shaughnessy Elementary School
Air Bud
Diary of a Wimpy Kid
The Perfect Score

St. Andrew's-Wesley United Church
Dark Angel
Supernatural

St. George's School
21 Jump Street
MacGyver
Neon Rider
Smallville
The X-Files
Midnight Sun

St. Patrick's Regional Secondary School
I Love You, Beth Cooper

Simon Fraser University Downtown Campus
Fantastic Four: Rise of the Silver Surfer

Stanley Park
50/50
The 6th Day
Cousins
Fringe (TV series)
Highlander: The Series (TV series)
It
MacGyver (TV series)
Mr. Magoo
Psych (TV series)
Stargate SG-1
That Cold Day in the Park
The X-Files (TV series)

Templeton Secondary School
Aliens in America
Bionic Woman (TV series)
The Boy Who Cried Werewolf
Diary of a Wimpy Kid
Diary of a Wimpy Kid: Rodrick Rules
Gym Teacher: The Movie
Kyle XY
Personal Effects
Safety Glass
Scooby-Doo! The Mystery Begins
The Secret Circle
Smallville (TV series)
Spectacular!
Supernatural
The Vampire Diaries (pilot)
What Goes Up

Vancouver Aquarium in Stanley Park
Ballistic: Ecks vs. Sever
Good Luck Chuck
Josie and The Pussycats
Psych (TV series)
Smallville (TV series)
The Suite Life Movie
Taken (TV series)
The X-Files (TV series)
The Flash (TV series)
The 100 (TV series)
Prison Break (TV series)
Imposters (TV series)
A Million Little Things (TV series)
To All the Boys I've Loved Before 2 (Netflix Original)
Twilight Zone (TV series)

Vancouver Art Gallery
The 4400 (TV series)
The Accused
Arrow (TV series)
Battle in Seattle
Caprica
The Core
The Deal
Elegy
Fringe (TV series)
The Killing
Life Unexpected
Night at the Museum
Scooby-Doo 2: Monsters Unleashed
Sliders (TV series)
Smallville (TV series)
Stargate SG-1 (TV series)
This Means War
The X-Files (TV series)
X-Men: The Last Stand

Vancouver College
21 Jump Street
Final Destination 3
She's the Man
Smallville (TV series)
Wonder
The X-Files (TV series)

Vancouver Film Studios
Battlestar Galactica
The Chronicles of Riddick
In the Name of the King: A Dungeon Siege Tale

Vancouver Public Library
The 6th Day
88 Minutes
Ballistic: Ecks vs. Sever
Battle in Seattle
Battlestar Galactica (TV series)
Caprica (TV series)
The Dead Zone (TV series)
Double Jeopardy
Fringe (TV series)
The Imaginarium of Doctor Parnassus
The Killing (TV series)
Mr. Magoo
Smallville (TV series)
Stargate SG-1
This Means War
Tru Calling

Vancouver Technical Secondary School

21 Jump Street (TV series)
Diary of a Wimpy Kid
Ernest Goes to School
Elysium
The Killing
Marmaduke
Paycheck
Psych (TV series)
Scary Movie
She's The Man
Smallville (TV series)
Spectacular!
Supernatural (TV series)
iZombie (TV series)

Vanier Park
The 4400 (TV series)
MacGyver (TV series)
Romeo Must Die

Viking Hall
Out Of The Blue

Waterfront Station
Fringe (TV series)
Life Unexpected

West Point Grey
Life-Size

Windermere Secondary School
21 Jump Street (TV series)
Bionic Woman

Yaletown
88 Minutes
Good Luck Chuck
Rumble in the Bronx
Stargate SG-1 (TV series)

University Endowment Lands

University of British Columbia (UBC)

Buchanan Building block and Buchanan Tower:
The Man in the High Castle (TV series)
The 4400 (TV series)
The Exorcism of Emily Rose
Fringe (TV series)
Supernatural
X-Men Origins: Wolverine
Chan Centre for the Performing Arts:
The 4400 (TV series)
All I Want
Almost Human (TV series)
Antitrust
Backstrom (TV series)
Battlestar Galactica (TV series)
Bionic Woman
Continuum (TV series)
The Dead Zone (TV series)
Eureka (TV series)
Fantastic Four: Rise of the Silver Surfer
Fringe (TV series)
Josie and the Pussycats
The King of Fighters
Kyle XY
Psych (TV series)
Reaper (TV series)
Stargate Atlantis
Try Seventeen
Chemistry Building:
Fringe (TV series)
Kingdom Hospital
Supernatural
Forest Sciences Centre:
The 4400 (TV series)
General Services Administration Building:
Taken
Geography Building:
The Butterfly Effect
Life Unexpected
Green College:
Good Luck Chuck
Harper's Island
Irving K. Barber Learning Centre:
Emily Owens M.D.
Fringe (TV series)
The X-Files (TV series)
Faculty of Pharmaceutical Sciences Building
The Flash (2014 TV series)
Kenny Building:
The Exorcism of Emily Rose
Koerner Library and Square:
88 Minutes
Battlestar Galactica (TV series)
The Butterfly Effect
Hellcats (TV series)
The L Word (TV series)
Psych (TV series)
Ratko: The Dictator's Son
Smallville (TV series)
Wind Chill
Liu Institute for Global Issues – Case study room:
Smokin' Aces 2: Assassins' Ball
MacMillan Building:
The Exorcism of Emily Rose
Morris and Helen Belkin Art Gallery:
Antitrust
Killer Instinct (TV series)
Museum of Anthropology at UBC:
Intersection
Masterminds
Psych (TV series)
Smallville (TV series)
Music Building:
Life Unexpected
Old Bus Loop:
The 4400 (TV series)
Rose Garden:
The 4400 (TV series)
Battlestar Galactica (TV series)
Fringe (TV series)
Thunderbird Stadium:
Psych (TV series)
She's the Man
TRIUMF:
Pathfinder
War Memorial Gym:
Taken

University Hill Secondary School
Ernest Goes to School
Hellcats (TV series)
Jennifer's Body

University Marketplace
The 4400 (TV series)

Thunderbird Stadium
She's the Man
Final Destination 3

District of West Vancouver

Panorama Studios
That Cold Day in the Park (1969)
Carnal Knowledge (1971)
McCabe & Mrs. Miller (1971) (only used PBS Studios projection room to run dailies)
Let's Make a Deal (1980–1981 version)
Tom Jones (TV series) (1980–1981)
Pitfall (game show) (1981–1982)

Park Royal Shopping Centre
Life-Size

Collingwood School
The Last Mimzy

Whistler
MTV's Peak Season
Ski School (1990)
Ski School (1994)
The X-Files: I Want to Believe

City of White Rock
Behind The Camera: The Unauthorized Story of Diff'rent Strokes
Big Meat Eater
The Day The Earth Stood Still
Deck The Halls
Driven to Kill
Juno
Knock-Out
Psych (TV series)
The Railrodder
Sisterhood of the Traveling Pants
The X-Files (TV series)
Likey (Twice music video)

See also
Metro Vancouver
Hollywood North
List of filming locations in the BC Interior
Cinema of Canada
Montreal in films
List of films shot in Toronto

References
Titles with locations including British Columbia, Canada from The Internet Movie Database

External links
British Columbia Film Commission
Smallville filming locations
Landmarks and locations used during the filming of Stargate SG-1
Robert Altman's Vancouver

 
Lower Mainland
Cinema of British Columbia
Filming locations